Loud 'n' Proud is the fourth studio album by the Scottish hard rock band Nazareth, and their second to be released in 1973. It is the first of two albums the band released to reach #1 in the Austrian charts.

Track listing

1996 Castle Communications Bonus Tracks

2001 30th Anniversary Bonus Track

2010 Salvo Records Remaster Bonus Tracks
BBC Sessions:

BBC live recordings, recorded for The Bob Harris Show. First transmission date 13 August 1973.

Personnel

Band members
Dan McCafferty - lead vocals
Darrell Sweet - percussion, drums, backing vocals
Pete Agnew - bass guitar, Fuzz bass (track 8), backing vocals
Manny Charlton (Manuel Charlton) - lead, slide and acoustic guitars, backing vocals

Other credits
Roger Glover - producer, bass guitar, percussion (track 5)
Mike Brown, Robert M. Corich - remastering
Geoff Emerick, Bob Harper, John Mills - engineers
Dave Field - sleeve

Charts

Weekly charts

Year-end charts

Certifications

References

External links
Lyrics to songs from Loud 'n' Proud

Nazareth (band) albums
1974 albums
Albums produced by Roger Glover
A&M Records albums
Albums recorded at Apple Studios